Fallopia baldschuanica (syn. Polygonum baldschuanicum) is an Asian species of flowering plant in the knotweed family known by several common names, including Russian-vine, Bukhara fleeceflower,  Chinese fleecevine, mile-a-minute and silver lace vine. It is native to Asia (China, Russia, Kazakhstan, etc.), and is growing wild in parts of Europe and North and Central America as an introduced species.

Some authors split the species in two, regarding the Chinese populations as Fallopia aubertii and the Russian and central Asian species as F. baldschuanica.

Fallopia baldschuanica is grown as an ornamental plant for its flower-laced vines. The white flowers are decorative and provide nectar and pollen for the honey bee. As it is fast-growing, it is used as cover for unsightly fences and other garden structures.  It can become invasive, however.

Description

Fallopia baldschuanica is a vining plant with woody, climbing stems  at least  in length. Flowers hang on short pedicels. Each five-lobed flower is just under a centimeter long and white to greenish or pale pink, sometimes turning bright pink as the fruit develops.

In culture
It features in Nemesis, by Agatha Christie. The greenhouse at the Old Manor House of the three sisters collapsed. The sisters planted this creeper to cover what they could not restore. Miss Marple names the plant upon seeing it about to bloom, under its former name of Polygonum baldschuanicum. It is also the title of Chapter 9 and represents a theme in the novel.

See also
Japanese knotweed

References

External links
Jepson Manual Treatment, University of California
Kemper Center for Home Gardening, Missouri Botanical Garden

baldschuanica
Flora of Asia
Plants described in 1883